Nelson Samuel Mensah (born 7 December 1973) is a Ghanaian former professional footballer who played as a forward.

Club career
Mensah played two seasons with Romanian side Dinamo București, featuring for them in the 1992–93 UEFA Champions League. He was one of the first foreign players that arrived in Romania after the 1989 Revolution and the first African player to play in the Romanian top division Divizia A.

International career
Mensah made his debut for Ghana in a 1–0 victory against Nigeria at the 1991 CEDEAO Cup in which he scored the only goal of the match. His second game was a friendly game in which he came as a substitute in a 2–0 victory against Indonesia.

Career statistics

Club

Notes

Honours
Dinamo București
Divizia A: 1991–92

References

1973 births
Living people
Ghanaian footballers
Ghana international footballers
Ghanaian expatriate footballers
Association football forwards
Liga I players
FC Dinamo București players
Hapoel Tel Aviv F.C. players
Ghanaian expatriate sportspeople in Romania
Expatriate footballers in Romania
Ghanaian expatriate sportspeople in Israel
Expatriate footballers in Israel